The flag of Koror was approved on 10 July 1997 by Ibedul Gibbons and was officially adopted on 25 July 1997.

Description
The flag's specific construction details are that the width of the flag shall bear a ratio to its length of 1 to 1.667. The diameter of the moon/star circle shall bear 
a ratio to its width of the flag of 1 to 1.44. The center of the circle shall be placed vertically at the center and horizontally at 1/3 point from the
left of the flag.

The blue background represents the ocean and the golden moon represents the new government. The six stars represent the six hamlets of Koror State with the larger star in the middle representing the union of the NgaraMeketii and RubekulKeldeu. The traditional bai house is on a foundation of ten stones symbolic of the ten traditional chiefs.

Notes

See also
 Flags of the states of Palau

References

Koror
National symbols of Palau
Koror